Devonport, formerly named Plymouth Dock or just Dock, is a district of Plymouth in the English county of Devon, although it was, at one time, the more important settlement. It became a county borough in 1889. Devonport was originally one of the "Three Towns" (along with Plymouth and East Stonehouse); these merged in 1914 to form what would become in 1928 the City of Plymouth. It is represented in the Parliament of the United Kingdom as part of the Plymouth Sutton and Devonport constituency. Its elected Member of Parliament (MP) is Luke Pollard, who is a member of the Labour Party. The population of the ward at the 2011 census was 14,788.

History

Plymouth Dock
In 1690 the Admiralty gave a contract to Robert Waters from Portsmouth to build a stone dock at Point Froward on the east bank of the Hamoaze at the mouth of the River Tamar. Plymouth Dock, as Devonport was originally called, began around 1700 as a small settlement to house workers employed on the new naval base that was being built around Waters' dock. By 1733 its population had grown to around 3,000, and by 1801 it was already larger than both the nearby towns of Plymouth and Stonehouse together.

Devonport
By 1811 the population of Plymouth Dock was just over 30,000 and the residents resented the fact that its name made it sound like an adjunct of Plymouth. In 1823 a petition to King George IV requested the town should be renamed, and suggested "Devonport". The king agreed, and to celebrate, the town built Devonport Column next to the recently completed guildhall; both were designed by John Foulston. Devonport was first incorporated as a municipal borough in 1837 under the Municipal Corporations Act 1835.

In July, 1849, the first outbreaks in what became a cholera epidemic arose on Union Street which connected Plymouth to Devonport, and were initially attributed to blockage of several house drains during construction of a new Millbay railway station. Devonport became a county borough under the Local Government Act 1888.

Dockyard defences

In the mid-eighteenth century a defensive earthwork was constructed around the town and dockyard. Within these dockyard 'lines', six square barracks were built between in 1758–63 to accommodate the garrison of troops required to man the defences. A series of redoubts were also constructed, forward of the lines, in the 1770s, including that at Mount Pleasant (of which there are substantial remains). In the early nineteenth century, the dockyard lines were strengthened with stone ramparts and armed with guns, and the adjacent ditches were deepened. These defences became largely redundant with the building of a series of Palmerston Forts around Plymouth in the second half of the nineteenth century. Much of the open land forming the glacis beyond the lines became Devonport Park in the late 1850s. Three of the six small barracks were replaced in 1854-6 by the sizeable Raglan Infantry Barracks, designed by Captain Francis Fowke (who later designed the Albert Hall); today only its gatehouse remains (and that in a derelict state), the rest having been demolished in the 1970s.

Mount Wise

The high ground south of the town is called Mount Wise. Enclosed within the town ramparts, it was given its own redoubt in the 1770s, with eight guns and two mortars protecting the coastal approach to the dockyard. In earlier times, a gun wharf had been established on the quayside here to the south-east; the gun wharf was removed (and re-established at Morice Yard alongside the Dockyard) in 1724, but the area remained dominated by the armed forces up until the present century. From the late-eighteenth/early-nineteenth century both the military Governor and naval Commander-in-Chief of Plymouth were accommodated in large houses on Mount Wise (in Government House and Admiralty House respectively). In 1805 a Royal Laboratory (an outpost of the Woolwich Arsenal) was established just north-west of the redoubt; small-arms ammunition and explosives were manufactured here, until the compound was converted into barracks accommodation (Mount Wise Barracks) in the 1830s.

21st-century Devonport
During the millennium decade, Devonport received government New Deal for Communities funding of £48.7 million; this enabled an extensive Regeneration programme to be carried out. Since 2009, the investments have begun to transform Devonport – physically, socially, demographically. Where once the area was run-down, depressed, and classified as 'deprived' in many categories, the 21st-century Devonport is beginning to achieve the city’s vision of … "The recreation of Devonport as a distinct place in modern Plymouth; a vibrant self sustaining community; a place of real quality, variety and interest, the pride of residents, attractive to visitors and a model of 21st Century living, working and playing."

The Admiralty's release of several land plots in Devonport has assisted the Regeneration project. One ex-MoD area, where new homes will be available from 2011, is the Admiralty House site at Mount Wise. Although there are pockets of regeneration work remaining to be completed, the waterfront district of Devonport is becoming one of the desired residential areas of the city of Plymouth.

In 2011, the Devonport Heritage Trail was introduced, complete with over 70 waymarkers outlining the route.

Facilities
Devonport has its own shopping street, a railway station, a swimming pool, park and a sports ground, The Brickfields. Since 2003, it has been the home of Plymouth Albion, the city's Rugby Union club located near Plymouth City College.

Devonport is also home to the Devonport Playhouse, a theatre located in the former Methodist Central Hall in Fore Street. The space was purchased and converted into a performance venue by the Plymouth Theatre Company back in 1987. It is a popular venue with the local Amateur Dramatic companies, choirs and dancing schools in Plymouth especially, since the closure of the Athenaeum in central Plymouth.

UTC Plymouth is a university technical college (UTC) which opened in September 2013 near Devonport Park. The UTC is situated on the former site of Parkside Community College, which closed in August 2008 due to falling enrolment.

The Torpoint Ferry service across the Hamoaze (River Tamar) operates from Devonport to Cornwall.

Devonport Naval base/Dockyard has, over the years, been known as "Guz" by naval ratings. There are various explanations for the nickname: the Royal Naval Museum says it is short for Guzzle and refers to Devon cream teas.

Notable people

 N. T. Carrington (1777–1830), schoolmaster and poet.
Charles Mathews, theatre manager and comic actor, lived here for several months before his death in 1835.
Leslie Hore-Belisha, 1st Baron Hore-Belisha (1893–1957) was born in Devonport. In the 1945 general election he stood for the seat as a National Independent candidate, but was defeated by Michael Foot. In 1954 he was elevated to the peerage as Baron Hore-Belisha, of Devonport in the County of Devon.
Ralph Alger Bagnold (1896–1990) was born here. He was a pioneer of desert exploration, and was the founder and first commander of the British Army's Long Range Desert Group. He also made significant contributions to the scientific understanding of desert structures.
Guy Burgess (1911–1963), one of the Cambridge Five spy ring that betrayed Western secrets to the Soviets before and during the Cold War, was born here.

Charles Darwin spent two months in Devonport from October 1831 waiting for the weather to improve so that HMS Beagle could begin its journey to South America. The ship finally left on 27 December and Darwin later wrote that those two months were "The most miserable which I ever spent".

References

Sources

Plymouth, Devon
Former towns in Devon
Suburbs of Plymouth, Devon